La Chapelle-Saint-Laud is a commune in the Maine-et-Loire department of western France.

See also
Communes of the Maine-et-Loire department

References

Chapellesaintlaud